German submarine U-1201 was a Type VIIC U-boat of Nazi Germany's Kriegsmarine during World War II.

She was ordered on 14 October 1941, and was laid down on 18 April 1943 at F Schichau GmbH, Danzig, as yard number 1571. She was launched on 4 November 1943 and commissioned under the command of Oberleutnant zur See Eberhard Ebert on 13 January 1944.

Design
German Type VIIC submarines were preceded by the shorter Type VIIB submarines. U-1201 had a displacement of  when at the surface and  while submerged. She had two shafts and two  propellers.

U-1201 was fitted with five  torpedo tubes (four fitted at the bow and one at the stern), fourteen torpedoes or 26 TMA mines, one  SK C/35 naval gun, (220 rounds), one  Flak M42 and two twin  C/30 anti-aircraft guns. The boat had a complement of between 44 — 52 men.

Service history
U-1201 was badly damaged during a US 8th AF raid on 11 March 1945. U-1201 was scuttled on 3 May 1945 at Hamburg as part of Operation Regenbogen. The wreck was later raised and broken up.

References

Bibliography

External links

German Type VIIC submarines
U-boats commissioned in 1944
World War II submarines of Germany
Ships built in Danzig
1943 ships
Operation Regenbogen (U-boat)
Maritime incidents in March 1945
Ships built by Schichau